Discover Bank v. Superior Court (30 Cal.Rptr.3d 76) is a 2005 case where the California Supreme Court ruled that an arbitration clause was unenforceable because a class-action waiver contained within it would exculpate Discover Bank from liability for wrongdoing involving small sums of damages.

Background 
The Discover Card cardholder agreement required any disputes be handled through an arbitration agreement. The company was accused of miscalculating late fees that would be very small dollar amounts for individual consumers but, in the aggregate, would be a large sum of money. The arbitration itself was not disputed but class action status was requested and denied by the company, based on Delaware law. The Superior Court certified the group under California law. Discover then appealed that decision.

Decision
Carlos R. Moreno, in the majority opinion, stated the Discover Bank test to determine whether a class-action waiver is unenforceable. Under the Discover Bank test, a class-action waiver will be unenforceable under California law when it appears in a "consumer contract of adhesion", when the disputes "predictably involve small amounts of damages", and where the plaintiff alleges that "the party with the superior bargaining power has carried out a scheme to deliberately cheat large numbers of consumers out of individually small sums of money".

The United States Supreme Court overruled Discover Bank in a 5–4 decision in the 2011 case AT&T Mobility v. Concepcion.

References

California state case law
2005 in United States case law
United States arbitration case law
United States class action case law
2005 in California
Discover Financial